Cardiocephaloides is a genus of flatworms belonging to the family Strigeidae.

The genus has almost cosmopolitan distribution.

Species:

Cardiocephaloides brandesii 
Cardiocephaloides hillii 
Cardiocephaloides longicollis 
Cardiocephaloides medioconiger 
Cardiocephaloides megaloconus 
Cardiocephaloides physalis

References

Diplostomida
Trematode genera